Forbidden Dreams: Encore Collection, Volume 2 is a compilation album by Greek keyboardist and composer Yanni, released on BMG Special Products label in 1998. It peaked at #7 on Billboard's "Top New Age Albums" chart in 1999.

Critical reception

In a review by Chuck Donkers of AllMusic, "Yanni's early albums for the Private Music label are mined for Forbidden Dreams, which spotlights his famously dramatic, even flamboyant synthesizer style in its embryonic stages; in addition to the title track, the compilation includes the fan favorites "After the Sunrise" and "Keys to Imagination" from the-80s."

Track listing

References

External links
Official Website

Yanni albums
1998 compilation albums